The 1982 United States Senate election in Texas took place on November 2, 1982. Incumbent Democratic U.S. Senator Lloyd Bentsen won re-election to a third term in office, defeating Republican U.S. Representative James M. Collins.

Democratic primary

Candidates
 Lloyd Bentsen, incumbent U.S. Senator
 Joe Sullivan, minister and perennial candidate for U.S. Representative from San Antonio

Results

Republican primary

Candidates
 James M. Collins, U.S. Representative from Dallas
 Walter H. Mengden
 Don Richardson, electronics salesman from Houston

Results

General election

Results

See also 
 1982 United States Senate elections

References

1982
Texas
United States Senate